is a railway station in the city of Shibata, Niigata, Japan, operated by East Japan Railway Company (JR East).

Lines
Kaji Station is served by the Uetsu Main Line, and is 30.3 kilometers from the starting point of the line at Niitsu Station.

Station layout
The station consists of one  island platform connected to the station building by a footbridge.  The station is unattended.

Platforms

History
Kaji Station opened on 1 June 1914. With the privatization of Japanese National Railways (JNR) on 1 April 1987, the station came under the control of JR East.

Surrounding area
Shibata Nanata Junior High School

See also
 List of railway stations in Japan

External links
 JR East station information 

Railway stations in Niigata Prefecture
Uetsu Main Line
Railway stations in Japan opened in 1914
Shibata, Niigata